The Faulkes Telescope Project (FTP) is supported by the  Dill Faulkes Educational Trust. It provides access to 1,500 hours of observing time on two 2-metre class telescopes located in Hawaii (Faulkes Telescope North in Hawaii) and Australia (Faulkes Telescope South in Australia). This time is dedicated to education and public outreach, mainly in the UK, but also for smaller, selected projects in Europe and the US.  

FTP has operated a UK-wide educational programme since 2004, and currently works with science education projects across Europe and further afield (e.g. USA, Russia, Israel), including many EU-based science, maths and ICT programmes. FTP specialises in providing physics and maths education and outreach via astronomy and space science, utilising the unique access it can provide to research-grade facilities. The basic philosophy is to engage learners in “real science”, making them active participants in a range of astronomical research projects, ranging from observations of the solar system to distant galaxies. Teacher training (both face-to-face and online) is a core component of the FTP educational philosophy, and project staff have been involved in professional development work both in the UK and overseas, with teacher training days being held in Moscow, Santa Barbara, Munich, Lisbon, Paris and several other venues in Portugal and Spain.

FTP operates a broad range of educational programmes, with a strong emphasis on teacher training and engaging students with “real science”. A variety of research projects are currently being run on the FTs, with schools often participating in the role of data gatherers, particularly in long-term monitoring or short-term intensive studies or Target of Opportunity requests for transient objects (e.g. GRBs, supernovae, NEOs or X-ray systems in outburst).  

The project also provides extensive educational materials which can be accessed and downloaded free of charge from their educational resources website. These resources include astronomy video tutorials, online astronomy training, paper-based documents for use in the classroom, and pre-packaged data from the telescopes to use with the exercises detailed online.

Robotic Telescopes
The robotic telescopes used by the Faulkes Telescope Project are owned and operated by Las Cumbres Observatory Global Telescope Network (LCOGTN). Users must register for an account via FTP and, providing they meet the criteria for an account (as explained on the FTP website), the account details will be emailed out to the registered user. Students and teachers can then go online and book time on the telescope and run their own 29-minute-long real-time observational session on one of the telescopes,  remotely controlling it over the internet.  These telescopes are the largest robotic telescopes in the world available for UK schools to control in real time.

The project was the winner of the 2008 Sir Arthur Clarke Award in the category of Achievement in Education.

The Faulkes Telescope  Projects in cooperation with Hands-On Universe runs many student observing projects such as supernovae observations, asteroid observations, the Lifecycle of Stars project and Hickson Compact Group of Galaxies project. Details of these, and many more projects can be found on the Faulkes educational website.

Participants

Italy

Brunico
Nikolaus Cusanus - Sprachen- und Realgymnasium

United Kingdom

Bexley
Beths Grammar School

Broadstairs
The Charles Dickens School

Canterbury
Simon Langton Grammar School for Boys

Cheltenham
Cheltenham Ladies College

Dartford
Dartford Grammar School

Greater Manchester
Bury College

New Cross
Haberdashers' Hatcham College

North Yorkshire
Giggleswick School

Scotland
Lockerbie Academy since 2007 
Wales
Christ College Brecon
Cardinal Newman RC School
Ysgol Maesydderwen

West Midlands
King Charles I School

Armagh
Armagh Observatory

Jersey
Victoria College

Poland

Bełżyce
Zespół Szkół im. Mikołaja Kopernika

Dzierżoniów
Zespół Gimnazjów nr 3 im. Stanisława Konarskiego

Grudziądz
Zespół Szkół Technicznych
Planetarium i Obserwatorium Astronomiczne im. Mikołaja Kopernika

Kraków
V Liceum Ogólnokształcące im. Augusta Witkowskiego
Publiczne Salezjanskie Liceum Ogólnokształcące

Łódź
Planetarium i Obserwatorium Astronomiczne im. Arego Sternfelda

Niepołomice
Młodzieżowe Obserwatorium Astronomiczne

Olsztyn
I Liceum Ogólnokształcące im. A. Mickiewicza w Olsztynie
Planetarium i Obserwatorium Astronomiczne

Szczecin
XIII Liceum Ogólnokształcące

Toruń
V Liceum Ogólnokształcące

Warszawa
XXVII Liceum Ogólnokształcące im. Tadeusza Czackiego

Uganda

Lira
Dr. Obote College Boroboro

United States

Montauk, USA
Montauk Public School

New York, USA
Freeport Public Schools

Manhasset, USA
Manhasset High School

Greece

Athens
Ellinogermaniki Agogi, Secondary Education Establishment 
Tychero, Evros
High School of Tychero 
Senior High School of Tychero 

Romania

Oradea, Bihor county
Dacia Secondary School, Oradea

References
 Faulkes Telescope Project
 Faulkes Telescope Project education site
 Faulkes Educational Trust
 Las Cumbres Observatory Global Telescope Network
 Page of supernovae project
 List of polish participants

Astronomy education